The women's triple jump event at the 1998 Commonwealth Games was held on 21 September in Kuala Lumpur.

This was the first time that this event was contested at the Commonwealth Games.

Results

References

Triple
1998
1998 in women's athletics